CFER-DT, virtual and VHF digital channel 11, is a TVA owned-and-operated television station licensed to Rimouski, Quebec, Canada. The station is owned by the Groupe TVA subsidiary of Quebecor Media. CFER-DT's studios are located on Boulevard Sainte-Anne/Route 132 (near the shoreline of the Saint Lawrence River) in Pointe-au-Père, and its transmitter is located in Saint-Donat. The station also operates a rebroadcast transmitter in Sept-Îles (CFER-TV-2, broadcasting on VHF analog channel 5).

On cable, CFER-DT is available on Cogeco channel 5. Its local newscasts are carried on a dedicated channel on satellite provider Bell Satellite TV channel 101.

History
The station was launched on June 4, 1978.

On October 30, 2014, TVA applied to convert the station from analogue to digital operations, remaining on VHF 11 with an effective radiated power of 1.732 kW (maximum of 3.3 kW) at 430.1 meters in height, compared to 174 kW (maximum of 325 kW) at 432.8 meters in height (their current analogue configuration).  This application was approved on February 16, 2015. The station flash-cut to digital operations on VHF 11 on January 11, 2016.

References

External links
TVA Est du Québec

Fer
Fer
Television channels and stations established in 1978
1978 establishments in Quebec